Catherine Feuillet (born July 1965) is a French geneticist who is currently the Chief Scientific Officer of Inari Agriculture, a Cambridge MA based biotechnology company. Feuillet earned a PhD in plant molecular biology on the isolation and characterization of genes involved in wood formation in eucalyptus trees. She started to work on the genetics of disease resistance in wheat in 1994 during her post-doctoral studies at the Swiss Federal Institute for Agroecology. In 2004 she was hired as a research director at the Institut National de la Recherche Agronomique (INRA) in France to lead European and international projects on wheat genomics.

In 2008, she and her team successfully published the first mapping of the largest wheat chromosome, 3B and in 2014, they were also the first to publish the full sequence of this chromosome as well as a first reference sequence of the entire wheat genome together with the International Wheat Genome Sequencing Consortium (IWGSC).

Feuillet was part of the founding members and served as a co-chair of the IWSGC from 2005-2018. In 2013, she joined Bayer Crop Science the Head of Trait Research to lead the discovery and validation of genes to improve soybean, cotton, canola, and wheat yield and tolerance to biotic stresses.  She was honored as a Chevalier of the Legion of Honour and has been awarded the Prix Foulon from the French Academy of Science, the science award of the Femmes en or, and the Jean Dufrenoy Prize from the Académie d'Agriculture of France. She is an elected fellow of the American Association for the Advancement of Science.

Education and early life
Catherine Feuillet was born in Orléans, approximately 130 km (80 miles) south of Paris, grew up close to Paris and performed her university studies in Toulouse in plant molecular biology.  In 1993, she earned her doctorate at the Paul Sabatier University in Toulouse, on genes involved in lignification in Eucalyptus. Between 1994 and 1997, she completed post-doctoral studies at the Federal Institute for Agroecology in Zürich, developing molecular markers to support breeding for fungal disease resistance in wheat. During the course of her postdoc she started to work on wheat genomics and continued to develop disease resistance gene cloning and comparative genomics projects in wheat and barely as junior group leader and assistant professor at the Institute of Plant Biology at the University of Zurich.

Past research and awards
In 2004, she joined the Institut National de la Recherche Agronomique (National Institute of Agricultural Research) (INRA) in Clermont-Ferrand, France, as the research director and deputy director of the Genetics, Diversity and Ecophysiology of Cereals joint Research Unit. In 2005, she co-founded the International Wheat Genome Sequencing Consortium (IWGSC), an international effort to produce a high quality reference sequence of the bread wheat genome, a scientific challenge at that time given the size wheat genome is 5 times bigger than the human genome. In 2005 she also co-created and was appointed as chair of the European Triticeae Genomics Initiative (ETGI) which was aimed at coordinating research in wheat, barley and rye in Europe and developing collaborative projects. Between 2008 and 2012 she led a European project entitled "TriticeaeGenome: Genomics for Triticeae improvement" comprising 17 public and private partners in nine countries as part of the FP7 framework. In 2008, Feuillet's team published in the journal, Science, the first mapping results of the wheat chromosome 3B, which is the largest  of the 21 chromosomes of wheat.  That same year she joined International Triticeae Mapping Initiative (ITMI) to assist with planning and coordination of research projects. In 2009 she initiated and led Breedwheat, a large public-private partnership (27 partners) effort in France to strengthen the competitiveness of the French wheat breeding sector and address the societal demand for sustainability, quality and safety in agricultural production.  On 24 November 2009 Feuillet received the Prix Foulon from the French Academy of Sciences for her work in deciphering the genome. That same year, she was also awarded the gold Trophée de la Femme for her research and then on 10 September 2010, received the insignia of Chevalier of the Legion of Honour from the INRA.

In 2011 she joined the Wheat Initiative, created by the G20 countries to improve global wheat production and that same year was awarded a Fellowship by the American Association for the Advancement of Science. Feuillet received the Jean Dufrenoy Prize from the Académie d'Agriculture of France in 2012.

After completing the sequence chromosome 3B, the largest wheat chromosome, with her team at INRA in partnership with the Genoscrop and the CNRGV, a foundational achievement that was published in Science magazine, Feuillet joined Bayer CropScience as the head of the Trait Research Department.

Wheat genome sequencing

In 2004  when she joined INRA as a research director, Feuillet began her work on sequencing the bread wheat genome (16Gb, 21 chromosomes), with the aim of decrypting the largest wheat chromosome, 3B, which is 1Gb in size - the size of the entire soybean genome and more than twice as large as the entire rice genome. The initial strategy of the IWGSC was to produce physical maps of each individual chromosome and sequence them to get to a reference genome sequence. At that time whole genome sequencing approaches did not yield any high quality sequence assemblies due to the extremely high amount of repetitive sequences in the wheat genome. Feuillet and her team were the first to establish a physical map of chromosome 3B which was published the journal Science in 2008. This paved the way for other teams to complete physical maps of the other 20 chromosomes. In2014, the reference sequence of chromosome 3B was published by Feuillet and her team concomitantly with the publications of a draft sequence of each individual chromosome by the IWGSC, in the journal Science. The reference sequence of chromosome 3B revealed striking patterns of the more than 8,000 genes distribution along the chromosome and a better understanding of the organization, function and evolution of large and polyploid genomes such as wheat. The draft sequence of the 21 chromosomes enabled for the first time the annotation of 124,201 genes and comparative evolutionary analyses with diploid and tetraploid wheat relatives. These sequences anchored to many molecular markers on genetic maps, provided a springboard for faster gene isolation, rapid genetic marker development, and precise breeding through genome editing to accelerate wheat breeding.

Following a breakthrough by NRGene in the capacity to perform assembly of highly repetitive sequences in 2016, the IWGSC combined the physical map-based sequencing and whole genome sequencing approaches to produce a first version of a high quality reference sequence of the bread wheat genome. This was published in 2018 alongside other publications exemplifying the use of such a high quality sequence in Science. Since then, more than  publications referring to the use of the IWGSC reference sequence have been published demonstrating the usefulness of such a sequence, fulfilling the vision that Feuillet and her colleagues at the IWGSC established in 2005.

Sequencing the wheat genome completely is important for producers all over the world. Wheat currently makes up more than 20% of all calories consumed in the world, and as the global population increases, so does the need for wheat. Recently, however, wheat production has been stagnating because technological advances can’t keep up with negative economic and natural factors. The total demand for wheat is expected to increase by 70 percent by the year 2050—an increase of about 1.6 percent per year (Gonzalez). Sequencing the genome has provided an invaluable resource to scientists to accelerate wheat improvement and the capacity for wheat to cope with climate change and be produced in a sustainable and environmentally friendly manner through advanced breeding and technology.

Current research
Feuillet leads the science organization at Inari Agriculture as their Chief Scientific Officer. Inari's science organization comprises about 70 employees at their research sites in Ghent, Belgium, Cambridge, Massachusetts and West Lafayette, Indiana. Feuillet and her team work on identifying the regions of the genomes to be edited, and on developing a unique genome editing tool box that enables breeding by editing on major crops such as corn, soybean, wheat and tomato to bring plant breeding to anew age and solve a very complex problem; rapidly creating hundreds of new varieties that will perform optimally in their local environment while requiring minimal natural resources.

References 

French geneticists
French molecular biologists
1965 births
Living people
Genetic engineering and agriculture
Women botanists
Women geneticists
Women molecular biologists
Recipients of the Legion of Honour
Fellows of the American Association for the Advancement of Science
Scientists from Orléans
20th-century French botanists
21st-century French botanists
20th-century French scientists
21st-century French scientists
20th-century French women scientists
21st-century French women scientists